Arnoldus Schytte Blix (born 4 October 1946) is a Norwegian zoologist and Arctic explorer.

He was born in Borre to farmer Erik Gerhard Schytte Blix and nurse Marie Helle.

Schytte Blix was appointed professor at the University of Tromsø from 1980. He is particularly known for his research on thermoregulation of birds and animals in the Arctic fauna, and for studies of diving physiology of whales, seals and ducks. He is a member of the Norwegian Academy of Science and Letters, has received the Fridtjof Nansen Research Award and is a Knight, First Class of the Order of St. Olav.

References

1946 births
Living people
People from Horten
20th-century Norwegian zoologists
Academic staff of the University of Tromsø
Members of the Norwegian Academy of Science and Letters
Royal Norwegian Society of Sciences and Letters
21st-century Norwegian zoologists